Stańczyk  was a famous court jester in Polish history.

Stańczyk may also refer to:

Stańczyk (painting)
Janusz Stańczyk (born 1955), Polish diplomat
Przemysław Stańczyk (born 1985), Polish swimmer
Stanley Stanczyk (1925–1997), American weightlifter
Tomasz Stańczyk (born 1978), Polish sailor
Xawery Stańczyk (born 1985), Polish poet, sociologist, essayist

See also
Stanczak